The 2021 WTA Argentina Open was a professional tennis tournament played on outdoor clay courts. It was the first edition of the tournament since 1987 and first as part of the 2021 WTA 125 tournaments. It took place at the Buenos Aires Lawn Tennis Club in Buenos Aires, Argentina between 1 and 7 November 2021.

Singles main-draw entrants

Seeds

 1 Rankings are as of 25 October 2021.

Other entrants
The following players received wildcards into the singles main draw:
  Julieta Estable
  Sofía Luini
  Jazmín Ortenzi
  Solana Sierra

The following players received entry from the qualifying draw:
  María Victoria Burstein
  Martina Capurro Taborda
  Sol Faga
  Luciana Moyano

Withdrawals
Before the tournament
  Susan Bandecchi → replaced by  Irene Burillo Escorihuela
  Indy de Vroome → replaced by  Katharina Gerlach
  Federica Di Sarra → replaced by  Elina Avanesyan
  Jana Fett → replaced by  Laura Pigossi
  Julia Grabher → replaced by  María Lourdes Carlé
  Ylena In-Albon → replaced by  Andrea Lázaro García
  Leonie Küng → replaced by  Bárbara Gatica
  Gabriela Lee → replaced by  Victoria Jiménez Kasintseva
  Seone Mendez → replaced by  You Xiaodi
  Tereza Mrdeža → replaced by  Emiliana Arango
  Renata Zarazúa → replaced by  Carolina Alves

Doubles main-draw entrants

Seeds

 Rankings are as of October 25, 2021

Other entrants
The following pairs received a wildcard into the doubles main draw: 
  Marina Bulbarella /  María Victoria Burstein
  Martina Capurro Taborda /  Luciana Moyano
  Martina Roldán Santander /  Merlina Sarno

Champions

Singles

 Anna Bondár def.  Diane Parry 6–3, 6–3

Doubles

 Irina Bara /  Ekaterine Gorgodze def.  María Lourdes Carlé /  Despina Papamichail 5–7, 7–5, [10–4]

References

External links
 2021 WTA Argentina Open at WTAtennis.com
 Official website

2021 WTA 125 tournaments
2021 in Argentine tennis
November 2021 sports events in Argentina